Richard Omar Thompson (born 2 May 1974) is a former professional footballer who played in The Football League for Wycombe Wanderers.

Career
He was previously a youth player at Wimbledon. He played for Dulwich Hamlet during the 1997–98 season.

Thompson scored his first goal for Crawley Town against Dorchester Town in February 1999. After his spell at Crawley Town, Thompson joined Wycombe Wanderers on an 18-month contract in March 1999 after two trial matches with Wycombe's reserves. He had a loan spell at Kingstonian, for whom he made two appearances, before leaving Wycombe at the end of the 1999–2000 season, having made 6 appearances.

He subsequently had spells at Sutton United, and Carshalton Athletic.

He joined Bromley in summer 2002 after a short spell with Hampton & Richmond Borough, before rejoining Hampton & Richmond later that year, who he left in March 2003.

References

1974 births
Living people
English footballers
Footballers from Balham
Association football midfielders
Crawley Town F.C. players
Wycombe Wanderers F.C. players
Kingstonian F.C. players
National League (English football) players
English Football League players